Tilkanen is a surname. Notable people with the surname include:

Lauri Tilkanen (born 1987), Finnish actor
Vilho Tilkanen (1885–1945), Finnish road racing cyclist

Finnish-language surnames